Marcus Adriano Birro (born 15 June 1972 in Gothenburg, Sweden) is a Swedish-Italian (Italian citizen) poet, author and columnist and former frontman of cult punk band The Christer Petterssons. Birro blogged at Expressen and was a presenter on at Sveriges Radio Östergötland, where he was the host of Karlavagnen on Sveriges Radio P4. He is the brother of author Peter Birro. Marcus Birro lives in Södermalm, is divorced from his wife of 4 years, they have two children together. In 2015, Birro told the press about his ongoing relationship with a married woman, Micaela Kinnunen, wife of politician Martin Kinnunen, and later Kinnunen confirmed the relationship and her divorce via her Facebook page.

Bibliography 

 Lämna mig aldrig: en roman om kärlek - 2017
 Mitt hjärta står öppet - 2014
 Evangelium enligt Marcus - 2014
 Calcio amore : drömmen - 2013
 Att leva och dö som Joe Strummer - 2010
 43 dikter - 2006 
 Flyktsoda - 2005 
 Krig hela tiden - 2005
 Du är Christer Pettersson du också - texts from SR, SVT and newspapers - 2005
 Diktskola - Författarens guide till galaxen - 2003
 Landet utanför - 2003
 Kalashnikov - 2001
 Alla djävulska främlingar - 1999
 Skjut dom som älskar - 1997
 Det oerhörda och I den andra världen - 1992

References

External links
 Official site 

Swedish poets
Swedish male writers
Swedish people of Italian descent
1972 births
Living people
Swedish male poets